was the fourth head of the later Hōjō clan, and daimyō of Odawara. Ujimasa succeeded the territory expansion policy from his father, Hojo Ujiyasu, and achieved the biggest territory in the clan's history.

Early life and rise
In 1538, Ujimasa was born as the second son of Hojo Ujiyasu. His childhood name was Matsuchiyo-maru. As Ujiyasu's first son, Shinkuro, died young, Ujimasa became the heir of Ujiyasu.

In 1554, when Ujiyasu make an alliance with Takeda Shingen and Imagawa Yoshimoto. Ujimasa took a daughter of Shingen, Obai-in, for his lawful wife.

Upon his father Hojo Ujiyasu's retirement, Ujimasa inherited formal leadership of the family around 1559.

Hōjō Campaign
In 1560, Hojo clan seized Iwatsuki Castle and almost conquered whole Musashi Province. Ujimasa commanded in many battles, he took part in the Battle of Konodai (1564), including the Siege of Odawara (1569).

In 1574, Ujimasa forced Sekiyado Castle of Shimosa Province under Yanada Harusuke to surrender and also forces Yuki Harutomi a vassal of Uesugi clan swore allegiance to Ujimasa.

In 1575, he forced Gion Castle of Shimotsuke Province under Oyama Hidetsuna to surrender.

In 1577, Ujimasa invaded Kazusa Province and realized the reconciliation with his old enemy, Satomi Yoshihiro. This battle marked the first battle for his heir, Hojo Ujinao.

In 1580, after Takeda Katsuyori joined the force to support Uesugi Kagekatsu and Uesugi Kagetora killed himself, Ujimasa built a new alliance with Oda Nobunaga and Tokugawa Ieyasu. He invaded the territory of the Takeda clan in Suruga from both sides attacked Katsuyori, which triggered the Battle of Omosu.

In 1582, following the sudden death of Oda Nobunaga, Ujimasa took advantage of the situation and launched an attack on Oda clan territory at Battle of Kanagawa, who had received territories after the defeat of Takeda Katsuyori. 
Later, Hojo and Tokugawa clans settled a territorial dispute by giving the Tokugawa clan Kai and Shinano Provinces and the Hojo clan Kozuke Province.

Conflict with Hideyoshi
In 1588, Toyotomi Hideyoshi succeeded the unifying nation from Oda Nobunaga. Hideyoshi asked Ujimasa and Ujinao, the father and son, to attend the imperial visit to Jurakudai (Hideyoshi's residence and office in Kyoto), but Ujimasa refused it. However, Ujimasa proposed to reschedule the visit to spring or summer of 1590, but Hideyoshi refused the proposal, which worsened their relationship.

Death
In 1590, after Ujimasa consolidated his clan's position and retired. His son Hōjō Ujinao became head of the clan and lord of Odawara. Later that year, Hideyoshi launch the Odawara Campaign against Hōjō clan.

3rd Siege of Odawara

In 1590, Odawara Castle was the biggest castle in Japan at that moment. However, Hideyoshi surrounded the castle with the biggest army in all of Japan. Hojo's plan was to use all of his castles in Kanto against Hideyoshi via guerrilla warfare. However, Hideyoshi defeated all these castles one by one with his samurai. Ujimasa failed to hold Odawara against the forces of Toyotomi Hideyoshi; finally, Odawara fell. Later, Ujimasa was forced to commit suicide along with his brother Ujiteru.

Like many samurai who committed seppuku in the face of shameful defeat, Ujimasa composed death poems:

Autumn wind of eve
Blow away the clouds that mass
O'er the moon's pure light.
And the mists that cloud our mind
Do thou sweep away as well.
(雨雲の おほへる月も 胸の霧も はらひにけりな 秋の夕風)

Now I'm about to disappear,
Wondering how I should feel it.
From the emptiness I came,
Hence I shall return there.
(我が身今 消ゆとやいかに 思ふべき 空より来たり 空へ帰れば)

Family
 Father: Hōjō Ujiyasu
 Mother: Zuikei-in (d. 1590), daughter of Imagawa Ujichika
 Wives:
 Ōbai-in (1543–1569), daughter of Takeda Shingen
 Hōshō-in (d. 1590)
 Children:
 Hōjō Shinkurō (1555 – ) by Ōbai-in
 Hōjō Ujinao by Ōbai-in
 Ōta Gengorō (1563–1582) by Ōbai-in, son-in-law of Ōta Ujisuke
 Ōta Ujifusa (1565–1592) by Ōbai-in, son-in-law of Ōta Ujisuke
 Chiba Naoshige (d. 1627) by Ōbai-in, son-in-law of Chiba Kunitane
 Hōjō Naosada by Ōbai-in
 Hōjō Genzō
 Hōjō Katsuchiyo (b. 1590) by Hōshō-in
 daughter married Suzuki Shigeuji
 daughter married Niwata Shigesada
 daughter married Satomi Yoshiyori
 daughter married Chiba Kunitane

Relatives 
 Sisters
 Lady Hayakawa (Zōshun-in) married Imagawa Ujizane
 Jōkō-in 
 Brothers
 Hōjō Ujiteru, committed seppuku with Ujimasa
 Hōjō Ujikuni 
 Hōjō Ujinori
 Hōjō Saburō or Uesugi Kagetora, son-in-law of Uesugi Kenshin
 Hōjō Ujitada
 Niece
 Ashikaga Ujinohime

In popular culture 
Hōjō Ujimasa appears in Koei's video games Kessen, Samurai Warriors 2, Samurai Warriors 3 and Warriors Orochi. He is also in Capcom's Sengoku Basara 1 and 2 (including Heroes) as an old man who is armed with a spear and has both his ancestral spirits and ice attacks and assisted by Fuma Kotaro.
He also appears in The Creative Assembly's Total War: Shogun, and Total War: Shogun 2. Professional wrestler Akito wrestled as Ujimasa for the Dramatic Dream Team promotion on February 10, 2013.

See also 
Battle of Omosu

References 

Go-Hōjō clan
1538 births
1590 deaths
16th-century Japanese people
Forced suicides
Suicides by seppuku
People from Kanagawa Prefecture
16th-century suicides